NamRights, formerly National Society for Human Rights (NSHR), is a Namibian non-profit human rights organization, led by Phil ya Nangoloh who founded the institution in 1989.

References

External links
 Namrights web presence
 NSHR changes its name to Namibian Rights and Responsibilities Incorporated

Human rights organisations based in Namibia